Hussain Al Jassmi (born August 25, 1979) is an Emirati pianist, composer, musician and singer who is well known in the Arab world. Al Jassmi was born in Khorfakkan in August 1979 to Emirati parents. He released his first single "Bawada'ak" followed by "Wallah Mayiswa" and "Bassbour Al Fourgakom".

In 2008, Al Jassmi received the Murex d'Or award, under the category of "Best Arabic Male Singer."

His most popular song is an Egyptian Shaabi song, called "Boshret Kheir", written and composed by Amr Mostafa as a pro-elections campaign in Egypt.

Al Jassmi had many concerts all around the world. One of his well known performances include a performance in the Vatican's annual Christmas concert, becoming the first Arab to do so. He also has multiple events and concerts in the United Arab Emirates, Saudi Arabia, Kuwait, elsewhere in the Middle East and as performed at the opening ceremony of Expo 2020 in Dubai, UAE.

Discography 

 Singles
 Matkhafosh Ala Masr ماتخافوش على مصر
 Boshret Kheir بشرة خير
 We Tebga Le وتبقى لي
 Abasherek ابشرك
 Morni  مرني
 Faqadtak And Wallah Ma Yeswa  فقدتك & والله ما يسوى
 Raak Allah  رعاك الله
 Meta Meta متى متى 
 Al Sirat Al Mostaqeem اط المستقيم
 Seta El Sobah ستة الصبح
 Ama Barawa  أما براوه
 Al Jabal الجبل
 Ma Nesena ما نسينا
 Yalghalia يالغالية
 Habebi Barchaloni حبيبي برشلوني
Sunnet El Hayah سُنة الحياة 
 Right Where I'm Supposed to Be (Official Song of the Special Olympic World Games Abu Dhabi 2019) (Ryan Tedder with Avril Lavigne, Luis Fonsi, Hussain Al Jassmi, Assala Nasri and Tamer Hosny)
 Bel Bont El Areed بالبنط العريض

 National Songs
 Mabrook Eidek Yal Emarat مبروك عيدك يالإمارات
 Salman Elshahamah سلمان الشهامة
 Lohat Alazzi لوحة العازي
 Ya Shabab Elwatn يا شباب الوطن
 Watani وطني
 Riyadh Alhob رياض الحب
 Al Kuwaity Ma Ynsah الكويتي ما ينسى
 Hathi Qatar هذي قطر
 Hathi Masr هذه مصر
 Agda Nas أجدع ناس
 Koolna Iraq كلنا العراق
 Reqab Elezz رقاب العز
 Rasamnalak رسمنالك
 Ya Libya Ya Jannah يا ليبيا يا جنه

 Series Soundtracks
 Mahadesh Mertah محدش مرتاح
 Baad El Forak بعد الفراق

See also 

 Arabic music

References

External links

 

Living people
People from Khor Fakkan
Emirati composers
Emirati male singers
1979 births
Arabic-language singers
Singers who perform in Egyptian Arabic
Singers who perform in Classical Arabic